The Wondrous Voyage of Kornel Esti is a 1995 Hungarian drama film directed by József Pacskovszky. It was entered into the 19th Moscow International Film Festival.

Cast
 Gábor Máté as Esti Kornél
 Éva Igó as Editke mamája
 Gabriella Németh as Editke
 Gyula Benkő as Editke apja
 József Szarvas as Ábel
 Erika Marozsán as Woman from Vienna
 Olivér Csendes as Némafilmhõs
 Kathleen Gati as Bankárné
 Zsolt László as Ügyvéd
 Vera Pap as Kücsük anyja
 Edit Kormos as Kücsük
 Jenõ Kiss as Õrgróf

References

External links
 

1995 films
1995 drama films
1990s Hungarian-language films
Hungarian drama films